This article lists the winners and nominees for the Billboard Music Award for Top Billboard 200 Album. The award has been given since 1991 and since its conception only five artists have won the award twice: 50 Cent, Adele, Drake, Eminem, and Taylor Swift.

Winners and nominees
Winners are listed first and highlighted in bold.

1990s

2000s

2010s

2020s

Multiple wins and nominations

Wins
2 wins
 50 Cent
 Adele
 Eminem
 Taylor Swift
 Drake

Nominations

7 nominations
 Taylor Swift

6 nominations
 Drake

5 nominations
 Eminem

4 nominations
 Adele
 Celine Dion

3 nominations
 Backstreet Boys
 Post Malone
 The Weeknd

2 nominations
 'N SYNC
 50 Cent
 Beyoncé
 Justin Bieber
 Garth Brooks
 Mariah Carey
 Whitney Houston
 One Direction
 Ed Sheeran
 Britney Spears
 Shania Twain

References

Billboard awards
Album awards